Georgia, Florida, & Alabama Railway Co. v. Blish Milling Co., 241 U.S. 190 (1916), was a case decided by the Supreme Court of the United States.

The Blish Milling Company

The Blish Milling Company of Seymour, Indiana, founded by John Blish, son-in-law of the city founder Meedy Shields, shipped flour to Bainbridge, Georgia via the Georgia, Florida and Alabama Railroad. It arrived at its destination with water damage and the Blish Milling Company sued the railroad and the awarded judgment was upheld in Georgia Court of Appeals. The case was then appealed to the Supreme Court of the United States and set a Precedent.

During this time, Blish Thompson, John Blish's grandson, was company secretary and sales manager. He attended Hanover College and Yale University but tragically lost his life in the sinking of the RMS Lusitania. He was a first class passenger on his way to the Netherlands for a business trip.

Jurisdiction
U.S. Supreme Court 
GEORGIA, F. & A. RY. CO. v. BLISH MILLING CO., 241 U.S. 190 (1916) 
241 U.S. 190

Plaintiffs
GEORGIA, FLORIDA, & ALABAMA RAILWAY COMPANY, Plff. in Err., 
v.
BLISH MILLING COMPANY. 
No. 292.

Dates
Argued and Submitted March 15, 1916. 
Decided May 8, 1916.

Attorneys
[241 U.S. 190, 191]   Messrs. T. S. Hawes, Alexander Akerman, and Charles Akerman for plaintiff in error. 

Messrs. A. L. Miller and E. M. Donalson for defendant in error.

Full summary and opinion

[241 U.S. 190, 192]   

Mr. Justice Hughes delivered the opinion of the court: 

The Blish Milling Company brought this action in trover against the Georgia, Florida, & Alabama Railway Company, and recovered judgment, which was affirmed by the court of appeals of Georgia. 15 Ga. App. 142, 82 S. E. 784. The facts are these: 

On May 13, 1910, the Blish Milling Company shipped from Seymour, Indiana, to Bainbridge, Georgia, a carload of flour consigned to its own order, with direction to notify Draper-Garrett Grocery Company at Bainbridge. The bill of lading was issued by the Baltimore & Ohio Southwestern Railroad Company. The shipper's sight draft upon the Draper- Garrett Grocery Company, for $1,109.89, covering the price of the flour, with a carrying charge, was attached to the bill of lading and forwarded to a bank in Bainbridge for collection. The flour was transferred to another car by the Central of Georgia Railway Company, a connecting carrier, and reached Bainbridge on June 2, 1910, over the line of the Georgia, Florida, & Alabama Railway Company, the plaintiff in error, in accordance with routing. The plaintiff in error, without requiring payment of the draft and surrender of the bill [241 U.S. 190, 193]   of lading (which were ultimately returned to the Blish Milling Company), delivered the car to the Draper-Garrett Grocery Company immediately on its arrival by placing it on the sidetrack of that company. In the course of unloading, the Grocery Company discovered that some of the flour was wet, and thereupon reloaded the part removed and returned the flour to the plaintiff in error. The subsequent course of events is thus stated by the court of appeals (id. pp. 144, 145): 

'The railway company' (that is, the plaintiff in error) 'retook possession of the car and unloaded it, and in a few days sold, as perishable property, a part of the flour alleged to be damaged, and on December 23, 1910, sold the remainder. On June 3, 1910, after the Grocery Company had turned the flour back to the railway company, B. C. Prince, traffic manager of the Georgia, Florida, & Alabama Railway Company, telegraphed to the Blish Milling Company as follows: 'Flour order notify Draper-Garrett Grocery Company refused account damage. Hold at your risk and expense. Advise disposition.' On the next day the Miling Company replied by telegraphing to Prince, 'Sending our representative there. What is nature of damage?' To this Prince replied: 'Flour transferred in route. Slight damage by water, apparently rough handling. When will your representative reach Bainbridge?' The Blish Milling Company replied that its man would be there that night or the next day. On June 7 (after the Milling Company's representative had reached Bainbridge and conferred with the agents of the railway company and with the Grocery Company) the Milling Company sent a final telegram, saying, 'We will make claim against railroad for entire contents of car at invoice price. Must refuse shipment as we cannot handle.' It appears, from the evidence of Mr. Draper, that the price of flour declined after his order was given and before the flour reached Bainbridge. There [241 U.S. 190, 194]   is conflict in the evidence as to a tender of the flour by the railway company to the Milling Company's representative. According to some of the testimony, about 18 barrels of the flour had been sold by the railway company before the alleged tender was made, and therefore it was not within the power of the carrier to tender the shipment in its entirety.' The verdict in favor of the Milling Company was for $1,084.50, from which the court of appeals required a deduction of the amount of the unpaid freight, which was held to have been erroneously included. 
With other defenses the railway company pleaded that the shipper had failed to comply with the following provision of the bill of lading, issued by the initial carrier: 'Claims for loss, damage, or delay must be made in writing to the carrier at the point of delivery or at the point of origin within four months after the delivery of the property, or, in case of failure to make delivery, then within four months after a reasonable time for delivery has elapsed. Unless claims are so made, the carrier shall not be liable.' This defense was overruled. The court of appeals stated that 'so far as appears from the record, no claim was filed by the shipper,' but deemed the provision to be inapplicable. Id. p. 149. 

There are only two questions presented here, and these are thus set forth in the brief of the plaintiff in error: 

'1st. That the plaintiff's exclusive remedy was against the initial carrier, the Baltimore & Ohio Southwestern Railroad Company, under the Carmack amendment of 20 of the Hepburn bill [34 Stat. at L. 593, chap. 3591, Comp. Stat. 1913, 8592]. 
'2d. That, under the stipulation in the bill of lading providing for the filing of claims for loss or damage, the action was barred.' 
The first contention is met by repeated decisions of this court. The connecting carrier is not relieved from liability by the Carmack amendment, but the bill of lading required to be issued by the initial carrier upon [241 U.S. 190, 195]   an interstate shipment governs the entire transportation, and thus fixes the obligations of all participating carriers to the extent that the terms of the bill of lading are applicable and valid. 'The liability of any carrier in the route over which the articles were routed, for loss or damage, is that imposed by the act as measured by the original contract of shipment, so far as it is valid under the act.' Kansas City Southern R. Co. v. Carl, 227 U.S. 639, 648, 57 S. L. ed. 683, 686, 33 Sup. Ct. Rep. 391. See Adams Exp. Co. v. Croninger, 226 U.S. 491, 507, 508 S., 57 L. ed. 314, 320, 321, 44 L.R.A.(N.S.) 257, 33 Sup. Ct. Rep. 148; Cleveland, C. C. & St. L. R. Co. v. Dettlebach, 239 U.S. 588, 591, 60 S. L. ed. —, 36 Sup. Ct. Rep. 177; Southern R. Co. v. Prescott, 240 U.S. 632, 637, 60 S. L. ed. —, 36 Sup. Ct. Rep. 469; Northern P. R. Co. v. Wall, decided April 24, 1916 [ 241 U.S. 87, 60 L. ed. —, 36 Sup. Ct. Rep. 493]. 

These decisions also established that the question as to the proper construction of the bill of lading is a Federal question. The clause with respect to the notice of claims-upon which the plaintiff in error relies in its second contention-specifically covers 'failure to make delivery.' It is said that this is not to be deemed to include a case where there was not only failure to deliver to the consignee, but actual delivery to another, or delivery in violation of instruction. But 'delivery' must mean delivery as required by the contract, and the terms of the stipulation are comprehensive,-fully adequate in their literal and natural meaning to cover all cases where the delivery has not been made as required. When the goods have been misdelivered there is as clearly a 'failure to make delivery' as when the goods have been lost or destroyed; and it is quite as competent in the one case as in the other for the parties to agree upon reasonable notice of the claim as a condition of liability. It may be urged that the carrier is bound to know whether it has delivered to the right person or according to instructions. This argument, however, even with respect to the particular carrier which makes a misdelivery, loses sight of the practical object in view. In fact, the transactions of a railroad company are multitudinous, and are carried on [241 U.S. 190, 196]   through numerous employees of various grades. Ordinarily the managing officers, and those responsible for the settlement and contest of claims, would be without actual knowledge of the facts of a particular transaction. The purpose of the stipulation is not to escape liability, but to facilitate prompt investigation. And, to this end, it is a precaution of obvious wisdom, and in no respect repugnant to public policy, that the carrier by its contracts should require reasonable notice of all claims against it even with respect to its own operations. 

There is, however, a further and controlling consideration. We are dealing with a clause in a bill of lading issued by the initial carrier. The statute casts upon the initial carrier responsibility with respect to the entire transportation. The aim was to establish unity of responsibility (Atlantic Coast Line R. Co. v. Riverside Mills, 219 U.S. 186, 199-203, 55 L. ed. 167, 179-181, 31 L.R.A.(N.S.) 7, 31 Sup. Ct. Rep. 164; New York, P. & N. R. Co. v. Peninsula Produce Exch., 240 U.S. 34, 38, 60 S. L. ed. —, 36 Sup. Ct. Rep. 230), and the words of the statute are comprehensive enough to embrace responsibility for all losses resulting from any failure to discharge a carrier's duty as to any part of the agreed transportation, which, as defined in the Federal act, includes delivery. It is not to be doubted that if, in the case of an interstate shipment under a through bill of lading, the terminal carrier makes a misdelivery, the initial carrier is liable; and when it inserts in its bill of lading a provision requiring reasonable notice of claims 'in case of failure to make delivery,' the fair meaning of the stipulation is that it includes all cases of such failure, as well those due to misdelivery as those due to the loss of the goods. But the provision in question is not to be construed in one way with respect to the initial carrier, and in another with respect to the connecting or terminal carrier. As we have said, the latter takes the goods under the bill of lading issued by the initial carrier, and its obligations are measured by its terms (Kansas City Southern R. Co. v. Carl, 227 U.S. 639, 648, 57 S. L. ed. 683, 686, 33 Sup. Ct. Rep. 391; Southern [241 U.S. 190, 197]   R. Co. v. Prescott, 240 U.S. 632, 637, 60 S. L. —, 36 Sup. Ct. Rep. 469); and if the clause must be deemed to cover a case of misdelivery when the action is brought against the initial carrier, it must equally have that effect in the case of the terminal carrier, which, in the contemplation of the parties, was to make the delivery. The clause gave abundant opportunity for presenting claims, and we regard it as both applicable and valid. 

In this view, it necessarily follows that the effect of the stipulation could not be escaped by the mere form of the action. The action is in trover, but, as the state court said: 'If we look beyond its technical denomination, the scope and effect of the action is nothing more than that of an action for damages against the delivering carrier.' 15 Ga. App. p. 147. It is urged, however, that the carrier, in making the misdelivery, converted the flour and thus abandoned the contract. But the parties could not waive the terms of the contract under which the shipment was made pursuant to the Federal act; nor could the carrier by its conduct give the shipper the right to ignore these terms which were applicable to that conduct, and hold the carrier to a different responsibility from that fixed by the agreement made under the published tariffs and regulations. A different view would antagonize the plain policy of the act and open the door to the very abuses at which the act was aimed. Chicago & A. R. Co. v. Kirby, 225 U.S. 155, 166, 56 S. L. ed. 1033, 1038, 32 Sup. Ct. Rep. 648, Ann. Cas. 1914A, 501; Kansas City Southern R. Co. v. Carl, supra; Atchison, T. & S. F. R. Co. v. Robinson, 233 U.S. 173, 181, 58 S. L. ed. 901, 905, 34 Sup. Ct. Rep. 556; Southern R. Co. v. Prescott, supra. We are not concerned in the present case with any question save as to the applicability of the provision, and its validity, and as we find it to be both applicable and valid, effect must be given to it. 

But, while this is so, we think that the plaintiff in error is not entitled to succeed in its ultimate contention under the stipulation for the reason that it appears that notice [241 U.S. 190, 198]   of the claim was in fact given. It is true that in the statement made by the court of appeals it is said that, so far as appears from the record, 'no claim was filed by the shipper.' We must assume, however, that this was in effect a construction of the provision as requiring a more formal notice than that which was actually sent. For the court had already set forth the uncontroverted facts in detail showing that the shipper (having made an investigation in response to the communication of the traffic manager of the railway company) had telegraphed to the latter, on June 7, 1910, only five days after the arrival of the goods at destination, as follows: 'We will make claim against railroad for entire contents of car at invoice price. Must refuse shipment as we cannot handle.' In the preceding telegrams which passed between the parties, and are detailed by the state court in stating the facts, the shipment had been adequately identified, so that this final telegram, taken with the others, established beyond question the particular shipment to which the claim referred, and was in substance the making of a claim within the meaning of the stipulation,-the object of which was to secure reasonable notice. We think that it sufficiently apprised the carrier of the character of the claim, for while it stated that the claim was for the entire contents of the car 'at invoice price,' this did not constitute such a variance from the claim for the value of the flour as to be misleading; and it is plain that no prejudice resulted. Granting that the stipulation is applicable and valid, it does not require documents in a particular form. It is addressed to a practical exigency and it is to be construed in a practical way. The stipulation required that the claim should be made in writing, but a telegram which, in itself, or taken with other telegrams, contained an adequate statement, must be deemed to satisfy this requirement. See Ryan v. United States, 136 U.S. 68, 83, 34 S. L. ed. 447, 453, 10 Sup. Ct. Rep. 913; Kleinhans v. Jones, [241 U.S. 190, 199]   15 C. C. A. 644, 37 U. S. App. 185, 68 Fed. 742, 745; Godwin v. Francis, L. R. 5 C. P. 295, 39 L. J. C. P. N. S. 121, 22 L. T. N. S. 338; Reg. v. Riley [241 U.S. 190, 1896]   1 Q. B. 309, 314, 321, 65 L. J. Mag. Cas. N. S. 74, 74 L. T. N. S. 254, 44 Week. Rep. 318, 18 Cox, C. C. 285, 65 J. P. 519, 10 Am. Crim. Rep. 402; Howley v. Whipple, 48 N. H. 487, 488; State v. Holmes, 56 Iowa, 588, 590, 41 Am. Rep. 121, 9 N. W. 894. 

Judgment affirmed.

See also
List of United States Supreme Court cases, volume 241

Additional court actions involving Blish Milling Co.
Blish Milling Co. v Detherage, 159 S.W. 816, 155 Ky. 319 Court of Appeals

External links
 
 
Present site of defunct Blish Milling Co. from Googlemap streetview
Blish family history
Article on Lusitania Sinking and Blish Thompson

United States Supreme Court cases
1916 in United States case law
United States Supreme Court cases of the White Court
Railway litigation in 1916